An Sung-Min (born 3 November 1985) is a South Korean former footballer who played for Daegu FC in the K-League.

Club career

An Sung-Min made his professional debut with Busan I'Park in 2007, and would stay a further two seasons.  He played a total of 38 matches in the K-League in his time with Busan, scoring 3 league goals.  He also made a number of appearances for the club in the Korean domestic cup competitions.  For 2010, Ahn moved to Daegu FC. In July 2011, he related 2011 South Korean football betting scandal.

External links 

1985 births
Living people
Sportspeople from Incheon
South Korean footballers
Busan IPark players
Daegu FC players
K League 1 players
Konkuk University alumni
Association football midfielders